Suhache Rock (‘Skala Suhache’ \ska-'la su-'ha-che\) is the rock off the northwest coast of Robert Island in the South Shetland Islands, Antarctica extending  in east-northeast to west-southwest direction and  wide.  The area was visited by early 19th century sealers.

The rock is named after the settlement of Suhache in Northern Bulgaria.

Location
British mapping in 1968 and Bulgarian in 2009.

Maps
 Livingston Island to King George Island.  Scale 1:200000.  Admiralty Nautical Chart 1776.  Taunton: UK Hydrographic Office, 1968.
 L.L. Ivanov. Antarctica: Livingston Island and Greenwich, Robert, Snow and Smith Islands. Scale 1:120000 topographic map. Troyan: Manfred Wörner Foundation, 2009.  (Second edition 2010)
Antarctic Digital Database (ADD). Scale 1:250000 topographic map of Antarctica. Scientific Committee on Antarctic Research (SCAR). Since 1993, regularly upgraded and updated.

References
 Suhache Rock. SCAR Composite Antarctic Gazetteer.
 Bulgarian Antarctic Gazetteer. Antarctic Place-names Commission. (details in Bulgarian, basic data in English)

External links
 Suhache Rock. Copernix satellite image

Rock formations of Robert Island
Bulgaria and the Antarctic